Le Déjeuner sur l'herbe (English: Luncheon on the Grass) is an 1865–1866 oil on canvas painting by Claude Monet, produced in response to the 1863 work of the same title by Édouard Manet. It remains unfinished, but two large fragments (central and left panels) are now in the Musée d'Orsay in Paris, whilst a smaller 1866 version is now in the Pushkin Museum in Moscow.

Monet included the artist Gustave Courbet in the painting.

Description 
The painting in its whole form shows twelve people. They are clothed in Parisian clothing which was fashionable at that time. They are having a picnic in near a forest glade. All the people are gathered around a white picnic blanket, where food as fruits, cake or wine is located. The mood in this natural space is primarily created by the play of light and shadow, which is created by deciduous tree above them.

See also 
 List of paintings by Claude Monet
 Le Déjeuner sur l'herbe (Monet, Moscow)

References

External links
Catalogue entry, Musée d'Orsay

Paintings in the collection of the Musée d'Orsay
Paintings by Claude Monet
1866 paintings
Food and drink paintings
Unfinished paintings
Works about picnics
Paintings in the collection of the Pushkin Museum